Mastan is a Bengali thriller movie released in 2004, directed by Rabi Kinagi. The movie featured Jeet, Swastika Mukherjee, Hara Patnaik and Mihir Das. It was an unofficial remake of 1999 Bollywood movie 'Jaanwar' featuring Akshay Kumar, Karishma Kapoor and Shilpa Shetty which was critically and commercially successful.

Plot
The film revolves around the life of Raju, a poor boy whose mother dies of starvation. He is taken under the fold by the local smuggler Bhanupratap. He grows up to become an antisocial and an associate of the smuggler. However, he decides to sever ties with the underworld after he falls in love with Mamata. But his past becomes a barrier as Mamata's father learns of their relationship. Ultimately Mamata is forced to marry Avinash, a CBI officer after her father suffers a heart attack. This transforms Raju into a ruthless criminal. Meanwhile, Avinash, the husband of Mamata, comes to town. He disrupts and puts a stop to Bhanupratap's smuggling business and he sends Raju to kill him. But Raju confronts Mamata who begs him to spare Avinash's life. Raju asks them to leave the city. The train Mamata was travelling in meets with an accident. They lose their child. Raju leaves the underworld (as he could not kill Avinash) and finds the child.

Cast
 Jeet as Raju/Raja (dual role)
 Swastika Mukherjee as Mamata
 Mihir Das as Abhinash Chowdhury
 Debu Bose as Debendra (Mamata's father)
 Hara Patnaik as Bhanu Pratap

Soundtrack
Singers are Babul Supriyo, Shreya Ghoshal.

Critical reception
The film was a critical and commercial failure and got mostly negative reviews.

References

External links
Mastan on www.gomolo.in
www.telegraphindia.com preview

2004 films
2000s Bengali-language films
Bengali-language Indian films
Films directed by Rabi Kinagi
Indian gangster films
Bengali remakes of Hindi films